"Talk Back Trembling Lips" is a 1963 song first recorded by Ernest Ashworth.  The song became the most successful of Ernest Ashworth's career and was his only No. 1 song on the Billboard Hot Country Singles chart that October.  The song spent 35 weeks on the country chart.  The song also bubbled under the Billboard Hot 100, just missing the chart's main listing as it peaked at No. 101.  Johnny Tillotson recorded a successful cover version in 1963 that peaked in early 1964.

Chart performance

Ernest Ashworth

Johnny Tillotson

Cover versions
Bowing at #91 on 9 November 1963, Johnny Tillotson took his version of the song to number seven on the Hot 100 on 4 January 1964. It was his last top-10 single.

Still in the early '60s, a more pop orientated version appeared by Australian singer Debbie Stuart.

Australian country singer Kevin Shegog recorded a cover of the song in 1963.

George Jones recorded a cover of the song in 1966.

Years later, country singer Becky Hobbs introduced the song to younger audiences with her 1990 cover version, although it failed to chart on the Billboard Hot Country Singles & Tracks chart. Ernest Ashworth himself appears in the music video as a guest.

References

1963 singles
Ernest Ashworth songs
Songs written by John D. Loudermilk
Johnny Tillotson songs
1963 songs